First African Baptist Church is a  church in Beaufort, South Carolina, that was built by freed slaves after the American Civil War. It is at 601 New Street.   Robert Smalls was a member of the congregation. Rev. Arthur Waddell was one of its organizers.

According to a historical marker at the church it is constructed in the Carpenter Gothic style. The church ran a school. The church is part of the Beaufort Historic District.

References

Church organization
Baptist churches in South Carolina
Buildings and structures in Beaufort, South Carolina
Carpenter Gothic church buildings in South Carolina
Year of establishment missing